Koen van Nol (born 20 January 1974, in Amsterdam) is a Dutch judoka.

Achievements

References

1974 births
Living people
Dutch male judoka
Sportspeople from Amsterdam
20th-century Dutch people
21st-century Dutch people